Hypocysta pseudirius, the dingy ringlet or grey ringlet, is a species of butterfly of the family Nymphalidae. It is found in Australia, including Queensland and New South Wales.
The wingspan is about 30 mm. Adults are brown with a large orange comma-shaped mark ending in an eyespot on each hindwing. The underside is similar to the upperside, but paler and the hindwings each have two eyespots.

The larvae feed on various Poaceae species. They are green or brown with stripes along the body. Full-grown larvae are about 20 mm long.

References

Satyrini
Butterflies described in 1875
Butterflies of Australia
Taxa named by Arthur Gardiner Butler